Jesse Barrett "Oley" Oldendorf (16 February 1887 – 27 April 1974) was an admiral in the United States Navy, famous for defeating a Japanese force in the Battle of Leyte Gulf during World War II. He also served as commander of the American naval forces during the early phase of the Battle of the Caribbean. In early 1942, a secret group of senior Navy officers empaneled by President Franklin D. Roosevelt assessed him as one of the 40 most competent of the 120 flag officers in the Navy.

Early life
Jesse Barrett Oldendorf was born in Riverside, California on 16 February 1887. He graduated from the United States Naval Academy in 1909, standing 141st in a class of 174, and was commissioned in 1911. Oldendorf served aboard the armored cruiser , the torpedo boat destroyer , the cruiser , the destroyer  and the armored cruiser California again, although she had been renamed San Diego. He also served on the Panama Canal hydrographic survey ship .

World War I
During World War I, Oldendorf spent a few months on recruiting duty in Philadelphia. The ship sank as a result of a collision in New York. He then became a gunnery officer aboard the troop transport , which was sunk by three torpedoes from the German submarine U-90 off Ireland on 31 May 1918.

Between the wars
Between the great wars, Oldendorf did a stint in charge of recruiting station Pittsburgh, acted as an engineering inspector in Baltimore, and served as officer in charge of a hydrographic office. In 1920, he was assigned to the patrol yacht . From 1922 to 1924, Oldendorf served as aide to Rear Admiral Josiah S. McKean, commandant of the Mare Island Navy Yard. In 1925, Oldendorf, now a commander, assumed his first command, the destroyer , Afterwards, he was aide to successive commandants of the Philadelphia Navy Yard, Rear Admiral Thomas P. Magruder and Julian Lane Latimer from 1927 to 1928.

Oldendorf attended the Naval War College from 1928 to 1929 and then the Army War College from 1929 to 1930. From 1930 to 1935, he was the navigator of the battleship . Following the normal pattern of alternating duty at sea with shore duty, Oldendorf taught navigation at the Naval Academy from 1932 to 1935. Then following this teaching assignment at the Academy, Oldendorf returned to sea duty serving as executive officer of the battleship  from 1935 to 1937. From 1937 to 1939, Oldendorf directed the recruiting section of the Bureau of Navigation.

World War II
From 1939 to 1941, Oldendorf commanded the cruiser . In September 1941, he joined the staff of the Naval War College, where he taught navigation until February 1942. On 31 March 1942, Oldendorf was promoted to rear admiral, and assigned to the Aruba-Curaçao  sector of the Caribbean Sea Frontier. In August 1942, he was transferred to the Trinidad sector where anti-submarine warfare was his primary duty. From May through December 1943, Oldendorf commanded Task Force 24 which was assigned all Western Atlantic escorts. His flagships during this period were destroyer tender  and fleet tug .

Oldendorf was reassigned to the United States Pacific Fleet in January 1944, where he commanded Cruiser Division 4 (CruDiv 4) from his flagship . Cruiser Division 4, consisting of cruisers and battleships, supported carrier operations and provided fire support for the landings in the Marshalls, Palaus, Marianas, and Leyte.

On 12 September 1944, Oldendorf commanded from the bridge of his flagship, the Fire Support Group tasked with the bombardment of Peleliu in the Palaus island group. At this point in his career, Oldendorf was an experienced battle commander who had handled similar assignments in three previous Marine landings. The bombardment was scheduled to last three days. By the end of the first day, aerial reconnaissance photos indicated that close to 300 of the assigned targets had been destroyed or seriously damaged by the all-day bombardment and that virtually every aboveground structure and fortification had been wiped out. At the airport its few usable planes were reduced to wreckage.

By the evening of the second day, every target specified on the master list in Pennsylvanias combat center had been struck repeatedly. However, Oldendorf was concerned because no return fire had been detected from the concentrations of enemy heavy artillery shown in earlier aerial reconnaissance photos and because the latest photos contained no evidence that these weapons had been destroyed. It was surmised that the Japanese had moved their heavy artillery underground where they could have survived the bombardment. Despite these concerns, Oldendorf made the decision to call off the bombardment at the end of the second day of a pre-arranged schedule that called for a third full day of attacks.

This would have tragic results for the 1st Marines' beach assault on Peleliu because the white coral outcropping designated as "the Point" was left virtually untouched despite Lieutenant Colonel Lewis "Chesty" Puller, commander of the 1st Marines, specific request to Oldendorf's staff to target it in the Navy's bombardment. "The Point" commanded the heights 30 feet above the north end of White Beach 1 on which the 1st Marines landed and was considered by Puller to be a potential defensive strongpoint too obvious for the Japanese to overlook. The result of not sufficiently reducing "the Point" was a bloodbath. Over 500 men were lost, roughly one-sixth of its regimental strength, on the D-Day White Beach assault on Peleliu and the entire beachhead was in danger of collapsing. It was only by the heroism of the Marines that "the Point" was taken. After the war when asked about Pelilieu, Oldendorf commented that "If military leaders-and that includes Navy brass-were gifted with the same accuracy of foresight that they are with hindsight, then the assault of Peleliu should never have been attempted."

On 24 October 1944, Oldendorf was the commander of Task Group 77.2 at the Battle of Surigao Strait. Oldendorf who was aboard his flagship USS Louisville which led the defeat of the Japanese Southern Force. He deployed his powerful force of battleships and cruisers in a classic battle line formation across the Surigao Strait, crossing the T of his opponent. Oldendorf's action prevented the Japanese from bringing their battle fleet into Surigao Strait and attacking the beachheads on Leyte Island. He later explained his tactics to the New York Times: "My theory was that of the old-time gambler: Never give a sucker a chance." For this action, Oldendorf was awarded the Navy Cross. In 1959 Admiral Oldendorf provided commentary on his planning for the battle:

On 15 December 1944, Oldendorf was promoted to vice admiral and made commander of Battleship Squadron 1. He commanded battleships in the landings at Lingayen. He was wounded breaking his collar bone at Ulithi on 11 March 1945, when his barge hit a buoy. Oldendorf assumed command of Task Force 95 in July, and led this force on two sweeps of the East China Sea. He was wounded, breaking several ribs, when his flagship Pennsylvania was torpedoed by a Japanese aircraft on 12 August 1945. On 22 September 1945, Oldendorf commanded the occupation of Wakayama and dictated terms of surrender to Vice Admiral Hoka and Rear Admiral Yofai.

Post World War II
From November 1945, Oldendorf commanded the 11th Naval District. In 1946 he assumed command of the San Diego Naval Base. From 1947 until his retirement in 1948 he commanded the Western Sea Frontier and the United States Navy reserve fleets at San Francisco. He retired in September 1948 at which time he was promoted to Admiral.

Oldendorf resided in Mount Vernon, Virginia, where he owned a large plot of land. Oldendorf died on 27 April 1974 in Portsmouth, Virginia. The destroyer  was named in his honor.

Awards

References

Bibliography

External links

 Jesse Bartlett Oldendorf Valor Awards and Citations
 Secret Panel on Jesse B Oldendorf
 Commander Task Force 24: Admiral Oldendorf
 USNA Class Yearbook, Lucky Bag Class of 1906 which lists Admiral Oldendorf's Class of 1908 
 Register of Commissioned and Warrant Officers of the United States Navy and Marine Corps, 1945 (NAVPERS 15,018)
Presentation of a Gold Star in Lieu of Second Award of Legion of Merit to Jesse B Oldendorf, December 21, 1944
Jesse B. Oldendorf Memoirs, 1945 MS 469 held by Special Collections & Archives, Nimitz Library at the United States Naval Academy

1887 births
1974 deaths
United States Navy personnel of World War I
Recipients of the Distinguished Service Medal (US Army)
People from Riverside, California
United States Navy World War II admirals
United States Navy admirals
United States Naval Academy alumni
Naval War College alumni
Naval War College faculty
United States Army War College alumni
Recipients of the Navy Cross (United States)
Recipients of the Legion of Merit
Recipients of the Navy Distinguished Service Medal
Military personnel from California